David "Tinker" Juarez (born March 4, 1961) is an American former professional BMX and cross-country mountain bike racer. His prime competitive years in BMX were from 1978 to 1984 and in mountain bike racing 1986 to 2005. Since late 2005, he has competed as a Marathon mountain bike racer. In all three disciplines, he has won numerous national and international competitions. Most recently, Juarez finished third in the 2006 Race Across America Endurance bicycle race.

Born in Downey, California, Juarez is a highly talented cyclist who has made significant impacts in the cycling disciplines of BMX Racing, Freestyle BMX, Cross-country Mountain Bike racing, and now Marathon Mountain Bike racing for over thirty years. While he was also known as the "Hollified Flash" after one of his home BMX tracks he used to race at and dominate in the early-1970s, the moniker "Tinker" is a nickname that was coined by his family. According to his Mother Rose: "We used to say 'Stinker' when he was a baby, everybody thought we were saying 'Tinker" David Juarez is so well known by his nickname "Tinker" many people probably think that is his real first name.

BMX racing career milestones
Note: In the early days of professional racing, 1977 and prior, many tracks offered small purse prize money to the older racers of an event, even before the official sanctioning bodies offered prize money in formal divisions themselves. Hence some early "professionals" like Stu Thomsen turning "pro" in 1975 at 16 years old where racing for small amounts of money at track events when offered even before the NBA, regarded as the first true national BMX sanctioning body, had a professional division. For the sake of consistency and standardization noted professional first are for the first pro races for prize money offered by official BMX sanctioning bodies and not independent track events. Professional first are also on the national level unless otherwise indicated.

*At the time there was no separate pro class for pros due to the relatively small number of pros. They raced with the 16 Experts, making it a Pro/Am class essentially. This is why during the early years of the pro division the national number one racer of a sanctioning body could be either an amateur or professional. This practice continued until the NBA's 1979 season in which the pros earned separate pro points and a separate pro plate from the amateurs.

Career factory and major bicycle shop sponsors
Note: This listing only denotes the racer's primary sponsors. At any given time a racer could have numerous ever-changing co-sponsors. Primary sponsorships can be verified by BMX and MTB press coverage and sponsor's advertisements at the time in question. When possible exact dates are used.

Amateur
Two Wheeler's BMX: 1974
Bicycle Motocross News Team (Test Rider/Racer): Late 1974-November 1975
Kawasaki Motors: November 1975-Early 1976
National Bicycle Association: Early 1976-Mid 1976
Mongoose (BMX Products): Mid 1976-February 14, 1982. Tinker would turn professional with this sponsor.

Professional
Mongoose: 1976-February 14, 1982. He was sponsorless for approximately three months after his separation from Mongoose.
JMC (Jim Melton Cyclery) Racing Equipment: Mid May 1982-December 1982.
Bandito Racing: January 1983-Early February 1985
ODI (Ornate Design, Inc.): April 13, 1985 – April 14, 1985. Seemed to have been a one weekend sponsorship since "ODI" does not appear next to Juarez's name in the BMX Plus! race results after this weekend. This company first started out making Christmas ornaments but switched to making bicycle grips and later grips for power tools as well as BMX and skateboarding accessories.
Maximum: Early July 1985-

Career bicycle motocross titles
Note: Listed are District, State/Provincial/Department, Regional, National, and International titles in italics. "Defunct" refers to the fact of that sanctioning body in question no longer existing at the start of the racer's career or at that stage of his/her career. Depending on point totals of individual racers, winners of Grand Nationals do not necessarily win National titles. Series and one off Championships are also listed in block.

Amateur

National Bicycle Association (NBA)
1975 14 & Over Novice Western States Champion
1975 14 & Over Intermediate Grandnational Champion #2 (Jeff Bottema was the winner of the first Main). This was the first ever BMX Grandnational Championship.
1976 15 Expert Winternational Champion
1976 14-15 Expert Western States Champion
1976 15 Expert California State Champion
National Bicycle League (NBL)
None
American Bicycle Association (ABA)
None
United States Bicycle Motocross Association (USBA)
None
International Bicycle Motocross Federation (IBMXF)

Professional
National Bicycle Association (NBA)
None
National Bicycle League (NBL)
None
American Bicycle Association (ABA)
1982 Pro Cruiser 2nd Place Jag World Champion (ABA sanctioned)
United States Bicycle Motocross Association (USBA)
None
International Bicycle Motocross Federation (IBMXF)
None
Independent Events and Series
1983 "A" Pro Second Place and Pro Cruiser Third Place Jag BMX World Super Bowl Championship Champion

Freestyle BMX

In April 1980, Tinker was named the first King of the Skateparks by Bicycle Motocross Action magazine. He even graced the April 1980 cover of the magazine, making it one of the first pure freestyle magazine covers by a BMX magazine. Although no contest was ever held, it was a general declaration for his highly advanced maneuvers that no one were matching at the time.

Career BMX accolades
 He was Bicycle Motocross Action's very first star interview in their first issue (December 1976/January 1977).
 He was one of the founding members of the Professional Racing Organization (PRO), the first attempt at a BMX racer's guild in 1977.
 He is a 1993 inductee into the ABA BMX Hall of Fame.

Significant BMX related injuries

Tinker, despite eventually becoming a top pro BMXer in racing and gaining "high airs" in both dirt jumping and vertical freestyle, went ten years without breaking a bone. It is very common for BMXers, especially in the pro ranks to become occasionally seriously injured because they are pushing themselves to as far as their talents can take them and beyond at high speeds, or in the case of vertical freestyle and dirt jumping to high altitudes and distances.

Miscellaneous and trivia
Tinker also participated in what was call Formula One (F-1) bicycle racing. F-1 racing was a short lived fad from 1987–1989 that involved bicycles with 20" wheels that looked like a cross between BMX, Road Race Touring and Mountain bicycles. Other famous BMX stars both retired and active at the time participated, including Harry Leary, Pete Loncarevich, David Clinton, Stu Thomsen, Eddy and Mike King. The two major BMX sanctioning bodies ABA and NBL, sanctioned the events. Tinker won the first ABA sponsored F-1 series race in Phoenix, Arizona in early 1988. In the following NBL sanctioned Grand Prix series he got a sixth in Memphis, Tennessee (the very first NBL F-1 race) and a second in Orlando, Florida.

BMX and general press magazine interviews and articles
 "Almost a Legend in his own Time. Tinker Juarez: The Hollified Flash" Bicycle Motocross Action December 1976/January 1977 Vol.1 No.1 pg.27
 "The King of the Skateparks Tinker Juarez" Bicycle Motocross Action April 1980 Vol.5 No.4 pg.25. Pictorial of Tinker performing Vertical Freestyle at Lakewood Skatepark in Lakewood, California.
 "Interview: Tinker Juarez" BMX Action January 1983 Vol.8 No.1 pg.26

BMX magazine covers
Bicycle Motocross News:
May 1976 Vol.3 No.5 with Perry Kramer and an unidentified racer.
Minicycle/BMX Action & Super BMX:
December 1978 Vol.5 No.12 (M/BMXA)
Bicycle Motocross Action & Go:
April 1980 Vol.5 No.4
May 1982 Vol.7 No.5 in last place behind Scott Clark, Harry Leary, Clint Miller Denny Davidow and Gregg Grubbs.
BMX Plus!:
None
BMX Weekly & BMX B-Weekly: (British publication)
January 14, 1983 Vol.3 Iss.2

Total BMX:

Bicycles and Dirt (ABA Publication):
October 1983 Vol.2 No.1 ahead of Ronnie Anderson and Rob Medrano.

NBA World & NBmxA World (The official NBA/NBmxA membership publication under two names):

Bicycles Today & BMX Today (The official NBL membership publication under two names):

ABA Action, American BMXer, BMXer (The official ABA membership publication under three names):
October 1983 Vol.6 No.10 (54) in third place on the outside behind Robert Fehd (472) and behind second place Shawn Texas (114) on the inside. Brian Patterson is in fourth directly behind Fehd.
USBA Racer (The official USBA membership publication):

Mountain Bike (MTB) racing career

In 1986, Tinker made the switch from BMX to mountain biking.  Since that time, Tinker has become a 3-time National Off-Road Bicycle Association (NORBA) cross-country (XC) champion and 4-time national champion in the 24-hour solo category.  In 1996, he became one of the first to see the introduction of mountain biking as an Olympic sport and represent the United States.  Tinker again represented the United States at the 2000 Summer Olympics.
Started Racing: 1986 at 25 years of age.

Sub discipline: Cross Country (XC), Endurance

First race result:

Sanctioning Body:

Turned Professional: 1989 

Retired:

Factory and corporate sponsors

Amateur
General Bicycles (General Bicycle & Moped Company): March 1988 – 1989 Juarez would turn pro with this sponsor.

Professional
General Bicycles: March 1988 – 1989
Klein Bicycles: 1990-1993
Volvo/Cannondale Bicycle Corporation: 1994-December 2002
Siemens Mobile/Cannondale: January 28, 2003-December 2003
Mona Vie: January 2004-December 2005
Mona Vie/Cannondale: January 2006–October 2021
Floyd's of Leadville: December 2021 - Present

MTB major career achievements

Amateur

Professional
National Off-Road Bicycle Association (NORBA)
1994, 1995, 1998  NORBA Cross-Country Champion
2001 National Champion
2001, 2002, 2003, 2004  National Champion, 24-Hour Solo Category
1995 1st (Gold Medal) – Pan American Games
1998 1st – National Cycling Association Cross-Country Finals

Career MTB accolades
 Tinker Juarez appeared in two of the first instructional mountain biking videos ever produced: The Great Mountain Biking Video released in 1988, and "Ultimate Mountain Biking: Advanced Techniques & Winning Strategies" released in 1989 by New & Unique Videos of San Diego, California.
 Juarez was selected as a member of the 1996 and 2000 Summer Olympics.
 He was inducted into the Mountain Bike Hall of Fame in 2001.
 Cannondale awarded Tinker its 'Icon Award' in 2005 for his contribution to the sport.

MTB magazine covers
Mountain Bike Action:

Ultra-Endurance racing career
In 2005, Tinker began training for long-distance road racing events. His podium finishes qualified Tinker for the 2006 Race Across America (RAAM), the annual transcontinental bicycle race from the west coast to the east coast of the United States. He came in third in the Men's Solo Enduro division of the RAAM endurance road race on June 22, 2006, completing the three thousand mile race which started in 2006 from Oceanside, California and finishing in Atlantic City, New Jersey. His finishing time was 10 days, 22 hours and 21 minutes.
Started Racing: 2005 at 44 years of age.

First race result:

Sanctioning Body:

Retired: Still Active.

Factory and corporate sponsors
Professional teams
 Siemens Mobile/Cannondale: January 28, 2003-December 2005
 Cannondale: January 2006–October 2021
 Floyd’s of Leadville Racing: December 2021 - present

Ultra-Endurance road biking career achievements
 3rd – Race Across America, Men's Solo - Enduro Category
 1st – Heart of the South (500 miles)
 2nd – Furnace Creak 508 (508 miles)
 1st (Gold Medal) – Pan American Games (1995)

Career MTB and Ultra-Endurance cycling achievements by year

1989
 1st – NORBA Iron Horse Classic
1993
 1st UCI Grundig World Cup win at Mont St. Anne, Quebec Canada
1994
 NCS National Cross-Country Champion
 Silver Medal – Mountain Bike World Championships (Cross Country)
1995
 NCS National Cross-Country Champion
 Gold Medal – Pan American Games
1996
  Olympic Team Member
1998
 NCS National Cross-Country Champion
 1st – NCA Cross-Country Finals
 2nd – NCS Cross-Country; Red Wing
 3rd overall – Tour of the Rockies
1999
 5th overall – NORBA Short Track
 9th overall – NORBA Cross-Country
2000
  Olympic Team Member
 5th – NORBA Cross-Country, Mt. Snow
 7th – NORBA Cross-Country, Mammoth and Crystal Mountain
 10th – World Cup XC, Mazatlan
2001
 NORBA National Champion, 24-Hour Solo Category
 Inductee – Mountain Bike Hall of Fame
 1st – Gorge Games - 24 Hour Solo Race
 1st – 24 Hours of Adrenaline - Laguna Seca
 1st – 24 Hour US National Championships
 5th – Mount Snow NORBA Cross Country Finals
 6th – Deer Valley NORBA Cross Country Finals
2002
 NORBA National Champion, 24-Hour Solo Category
 24 Hour National Champion
 1st – Gorge Games - 24 Hour Solo Race
 1st – 24 Hours of Adrenaline - Winter Park
 1st – 24 Hours of Adrenaline - Laguna Seca
 1st – 24 Hours of 9 Mile
 1st – 24 Hours in the Old Pueblo
2003
 NORBA National Champion, 24-Hour Solo Category
 1st – Solo 24 hours of Laguna Seca (National Championship)
 1st – Solo 24 Hours in the Old Pueblo
 1st – Solo 24 hours of Temecula
 1st – Solo 24 hours of Moab, Utah
 1st – Epic 75 at Big Bear
 1st – Solo 12 hours of Humboldt
 2nd – Solo 12 hours of Razorback
 1st – Solo 12 horas MTB Sampa Bikers (Itupeva, São Paulo, Brazil)
 2nd – Solo 24 hours of Mtn Whistle (World Championships)
2004
 NORBA National Champion, 24-Hour Solo Category
 2nd – Solo 24 Hours in the Old Pueblo
 3rd overall (1st, masters) – La Ruta de los Conquistadores (Costa Rica)
2005
 NORBA National Champion, 24-Hour Solo Category
 1st – Heart of the South (500 mile road race)
 2nd – Furnace Creak 508 (508 mile road race)
 1st – Solo 24 Hours of Mountain Mayhem (Eastnor, England)
 1st – Solo 24 hours of Temecula (Temecula, California)
 1st – Solo 24 Hours of Mohican Wilderness (Glenmont, Ohio)
 1st – Solo 12 hours of Razorback (Reddick, Florida)
 3rd – Solo 12 hours of Humboldt
 1st – Solo 12 Horas MTB Sampa Bikers (Itupeva, São Paulo, Brazil)
2006
 3rd – Race Across America, Men's Solo - Enduro Category
 1st – Solo 24 Hours in the Old Pueblo
2007
 3rd – Wilderness 101 Endurance Mt. bike race
2009
 1st – Tahoe Sierra 100 (Soda Springs, California)
2010
 1st – Master world Championship, Camboriu, Brazil
2018
 1st – Maah Daah Hey 100 (Medora, North Dakota)

Notes

External links
 2002 Dirtrag.com interview
 July 2005 Tinker Juarez Interview by FatBMX.com
 What Mountain bike article with current picture of Tinker Juarez
 The Official Tinker Juarez website
 The Race Across America website.
 The American Bicycle Association (ABA) Website.
 The National Bicycle League (NBL) Website.
 USA Cycling/NORBA Website.
 Ride424.com/Ultra-Endurance MTB Racing Website.

1961 births
Living people
Sportspeople from Downey, California
American male cyclists
BMX riders
Cross-country mountain bikers
Cyclists at the 1996 Summer Olympics
Cyclists at the 2000 Summer Olympics
Olympic cyclists of the United States
Pan American Games medalists in cycling
Pan American Games gold medalists for the United States
American mountain bikers
Cyclists at the 1995 Pan American Games
Medalists at the 1995 Pan American Games